Crassicantharus norfolkensis is a species of sea snail, a marine gastropod mollusk in the family Pisaniidae, the true whelks.

References

Pisaniidae
Gastropods described in 1972